La Rogivue was an independent commune in Vaud, Switzerland until it was incorporated into the municipality of Maracon.

References

Villages in the canton of Vaud
Former municipalities of the canton of Vaud